The president of Kiribati is the head of state and head of government of Kiribati.

Following a general election, by which citizens elect the members of the House of Assembly, members select from their midst "not less than 3 nor more than 4 candidates" for the presidency. No other person may stand as candidate. The citizens of Kiribati then elect the president from among the proposed candidates with first-past-the-post voting.

List of presidents 

The highest rank of the Kiribati Scout Association is the President's Award.

Latest election

See also
 Governor of the Gilbert and Ellice Islands

References

Government of Kiribati
 
Kiribati
Kiribati politics-related lists
1979 establishments in Kiribati